The W. Roy Wheeler Medallion for excellence in field ornithology was created on the occasion of the centenary of the founding of Bird Observation & Conservation Australia (BOCA) to commemorate Roy Wheeler MBE, FRAOU, (1905-1988), an amateur ornithologist with a long association with the Club, as well as with the Royal Australasian Ornithologists Union.  The purpose of the award is to honour worthy individuals who have been outstanding contributors, innovators and leaders in field ornithology in Australia and its territories.  Medals may be awarded posthumously and the award does not distinguish between amateur and professional ornithologists.  Ten people were recognised at the inaugural awards made on 12 August 2005.  Medallion recipients were:
2005 - Nigel Peter Brothers
2005 - Dr Leslie Christidis
2005 - Dr Robert Geoffrey Hewett Green AM
2005 - Laurence Nathan Levy
2005 - Dr Graham Martin Pizzey AM
2005 - Pauline Neura Reilly OAM, FRAOU
2005 - Len Robinson
2005 - Ian Cecil Robert Rowley CFAOU, FRAOU
2005 - Dr Eleanor M. Rowley
2005 - Professor Patricia Vickers-Rich

See also

 List of ornithology awards

References
Simpson, Ken; & Weston, Mike. (2005). W. Roy Wheeler Medallion. Bird Observer 836: 3.
Simpson, Ken. (2005). W. Roy Wheeler Medallion. Inaugural awards.  Bird Observer 838: 17–19.

Ornithology awards
Australian ornithologists